Çayırhan is a town in Ankara Province, Turkey

Geography 
Çayırhan is in Nallıhan district of Ankara Province. The population of the town is 9039 as of 2011.

History
The earliest document about the origin of the town is dated in early 1600s. While Nasuh Pasha (later grandvizier) of the Ottoman Empire was travelling from Aleppo (now in Syria) to İstanbul he commissioned three hans (inn,  a type of caravanserai) . The settlements around these hans were named after the hans; namely Nallıhan, Çayırhan and Uluhan. The town flourished after 1954, when lignite fields were found around the town. On the other hand, during the construction of Sarıyer Dam the settlement 
was moved  to east. In 1976 it was declared a seat of township.

Economy

Cattle production and agriculture were the traditional economic activities of the town. But nowadays lignite mining and the 3.6 billion kw-hr Çayırhan power station are the main revenue sources.

References 

Populated places in Ankara Province
Nallıhan
Towns in Turkey